The Blaiken wind farm is a wind farm built by BlaikenVind AB, a joint venture of Skellefteå Kraft and Fortum. It is one of Europe's largest wind farms in northern Sweden. The park consists of 99 wind power plants and has a total capacity of 247.5 MW. The farm has also been chosen as a demonstration plant by the EU's NER300 programme, one of the world's largest funding programmes for climate-neutral energy, and meets the challenge of developing good solutions for efficient wind power production in a cold and icy climate.

References

External links

Wind farms in Sweden